Table tennis women's doubles at the 2022 Commonwealth Games will be held at the National Exhibition Centre at Birmingham, England from 4 to 8 August 2022.

Finals

Top half

Section 1

Section 2

Bottom half

Section 3

Section 4

References

External links 
 Table Tennis results at Commonwealth Games Birmingham 2022 website – Select Filter by Event - Women's Doubles

Women's doubles